The Crownsmen is an American Christian gospel band.

The early years

Formed in the early 1970s by Dan Hunter, the original vocal line up was Dan (Bass), Ted Hunter (Dan's son, Baritone), Jim Davis (Lead) and Randy Price (Tenor). Dan acted as manager while young Ted Hunter spearheaded the musical direction of the group. Their first album Sounds of Reality was released in 1972 on a local Southern California indie label "Love Inc." The album featured the original studio version of The Crownsmen's most requested song "Heaven".

The Manna years
In 1973, The Crownsmen signed a deal with Hal Spenser's Manna Records, which was a division of Manna Music Inc. They stepped into MCA/Whitney Studios in Glendale, California, to record their first album on the label "I'm Gonna Take a Trip". The album featured such songs as "The Lighthouse", "Daddy Sang Bass", and Lavern Tripp's classic "I Know".  In 1974 The Crownsmen released their 3rd album, and 2nd for Manna, It's Gonna Be a Morning to Remember, featuring compositions by pianist Jody Barry. Original lead singer Jim Davis would leave soon after this album was released. In 1975 The Crownsmen recorded LIVE, an album that featured Rev. Dick Hillary as the Master of Ceremonies. Band members included Marty Adams (piano), Rick Mayfield (lead guitar), and Mike Gordon (drums).

All in the Family
In 1976 all four front members of The Crownsmen were all family members for the first time. Pam Hunter (Dan's daughter) and Rick Evans joined the group. This quickly became the best version of The Crownsmen ever, backed by band members (all music majors in college at the time) Terry Cross (drums), Keith Hughes (keyboards) & Gary Kaufman (lead guitar). "I'm Gonna Rise" was released in 1977. In 1979 The Crownsmen recorded "You Gave the Song" with the title song composed by Keith Hughes. This was probably one of the most versatile albums The Crownsmen ever recorded, with instrumental enhancements by new pianist Tracy Heaston. (Keith met Tracy by chance at university and the two traded situations between a full-time student and Crownsmen keyboardist.) "You Gave the Song" featured everything from Southern Gospel, to Country Gospel and Contemporary Christian Music. Group members' college graduations, marriages, and family responsibilities evoked the inevitable, "to everything there is a season."

The 1980s

In 1981 Dan Hunter brought to The Crownsmen former original member Jim Davis, former member Rick Gentry and new member Joe Wilson, who was the pastor for the Rock of Faith church in Ontario, California, which at that time was called Liberty Christian center.  Dan brought in musicians to form a full live band. The Crownsmen for the first time expanded to 10 members (including the bus driver).

The Crownsmen released the Country/Traditional album Back to the Basics, featuring such songs as "Excuses" and "God Walks The Dark Hills". The album was a return to traditional Southern Gospel Music. In 1982 The Crownsmen released their final live album and their final album for Manna Records, On Stage. The album featured songs such as "Heaven", "Where the Soul Never Dies", and "Empty Handed".

In 1983 the Crownsmen regrouped with Ted, his sister, Pam, Dan, and Rick Evans. The family performed concerts accompanied by Rick Balentine on keyboards and Jeff Olson on drums. This version lasted for only a year or two.

The 1990s
By 1990 Dan Hunter would see new life coming into The Crownsmen with wife Debbie, Brian Beathard on lead vocals, and Zack de la Rocha singing baritone. Dan would run through a number of musicians through the 90s before Zack finally run the whole band through his keyboard.  In the mid-90s Tony Gonzales, a fan of The Crownsmen, became the next guitarist, and The Crownsmen were set once again for The Road.

In 1995 Brian Beathard moved to Tennessee, leaving The Crownsmen without a lead singer.  Douglas Brown, already a veteran performer on the west coast stepped in to fill the lead part.

Dan got a surprise when the former lead singer "Rick Gentry" placed a call.  In 1996 Rick Gentry moved back down to Southern California and rejoined The Crownsmen and plans were underway for their next album.

The Road was released in 1998 featuring all brand-new material, songs written by Debbie, as well as Brian Beathard and Ted & Penny Hunter.

2000 & Beyond

In 2002 The Crownsmen released their final album with Rick Gentry, Debbie Hunter, and Zack delaRosa, called THE CROWNSMEN.  The CD featured a new version of "The Coming Of The Lord", as well as the Heavy Rock N' Roll version of "The B.I.B.L.E."

In 2003, Rick Gentry left The Crownsmen to sing with The Watchmen Quartet and Zack took a job with a recording studio. The Crownsmen shut down.

In 2005 Dan moved back to Arkansas where he was born.  Dan Hunter is currently working on the next version of The Crownsmen.

Ted Hunter formed a new music ministry with Penny, his wife of 30 years. Still, in demand as a highly respected musician, Ted is often called upon to assist other ministries in the area of music.

Tracy Heaston has become a pianist at Dollywood in Pigeon Forge, Tennessee, and the Echo Hollow Jubilee Show in Branson, Missouri.

Rick Evans went on to be a member of the Legendary Californians Quartet, and is a consultant to many churches and organizations. Rick also traveled with Dennis Agajanian and appeared for Billy Graham, Promise Keepers, and The Harvest Crusades with Greg Laurie. Rick also enjoyed more than 10 years as a featured member of The Franklin Graham Crusade team and in 2005 he became a member of gospel music's famous foursome, The Imperials (The Classic Imperials)

Randy Price became a member of The Legendary Californians Quartet.  He then went on to form his own group called Sweet Water in the 80s before becoming a member of The Songfellows Quartet in the 90s.

Both Jim Davis & Joe Wilson died sometime in the 1990s (exact dates unknown at this time).

Douglas Brown died April 13, 2006.

Keith Hughes won a national piano scholarship competition and completed a classical concert tour of the U.S. and Canada before soloing at Carnegie Hall. He became a conceptual writer in the creative development of projects for The Walt Disney Company, Warner Bros., FOX Entertainment, and Universal Studios.

Rick Balentine is a composer and producer in Los Angeles composing music for many clients including Coke, Chevrolet, GMC, JCPenney and Budweiser as well as composing orchestral music for music libraries. He owns SCORE LA <media> recording studios in Van Nuys California, a fully equipped 5.1 music production facility, and is currently working on composing music for video games.

Vocal Members
01. Dan Hunter (Bass) 1970–present
02. Ted Hunter (Baritone) 1970-1980, 1983
03. Jim Davis (Lead, Baritone) 1970-1974, 1980–1982
04. Randy Price (Tenor) 1970-1976
05. Floyd Terry (Lead) 1974
06. Rick Gentry (Lead) 1975-1976, 1980–1982, 1996-2002
07. Pam Hunter (Tenor) 1976-1980, 1983
08. Rick Evans (Lead) 1976-1980, 1983
09. Joe Wilson (Tenor) 1980-1982
10. Wayne Landes (Lead) 1980-1993
11. Debbie Hunter (Tenor) 1990-2002
12. Zack delaRosa (Baritone) 1990-2002
13. Brian Beathard (Lead) 1993-1995
14. Douglas Brown (Lead) 1995-1996

Band members
01. Ted Hunter (Bass Guitar / Steel Guitar) 1970-1980, 1983
02. Jim Stucky (Piano) 1970-1972
03. John Billester (Drums) 1970-1974
04. Danny Potson (Guitar) 1970-1973
05. Jody Barry (Piano) 1973-1974
06. Rich Mayfield (Guitar) 1973-1975
07. Marty Adams (Piano) 1975-1976
08. Ken Snyder (Drums) 1975-1976
09. Keith Hughes (Piano/synth/composer) 1976-1978
10. Mike Gordon (Drums) 1975-1976
11. Terry Cross (Drums) 1977-1980
12. Gary Kauffman (Guitar) 1977-1979
13. Tracy Heaston (Piano/Keyboards) 1979-1980
14. Tim Bailey (Guitar) 1979-1980
15. Roy Cooper (Bass) 1980-1983
16. John Thompson (Guitar, Steel) 1980-1983
17. Chris Harring (Drums) 1980-1982
18. Mike Cross (Piano) 1980-1983
19. Wayne Landes (Guitar, Fiddle, Banjo, Mandolin, Hands) 1980-1983
20. Jeff Olson (Drums) 1982-1985
21. Zack delaRosa (Keyboards) 1990-2002
22. Kenny Jure Jr (Drums, Guitars) 1991-1993
23. Tony Gonzales (Guitar) 1995-2001
24. Nelson Beltran (Guitar) 2001
24. Don Wheeler (Guitar) 2001-2002

Discography
1972 Sounds of Reality (Love, Inc)
1973 I'm Gonna Take A Trip (Manna Records)
1974 It's Gonna Be A Morning to Remember (Manna Records)
1975 The Crownsmen LIVE (Manna Records)
1978 I'm Gonna Rise (Manna Records)
1979 You Gave the Song (Manna Records)
1981 Back To the Basics (Manna Records)
1982 On Stage (Manna Records)
1998 The Road (HC Ministries/Indie)
2002 The Crownsmen (HC Ministries/Indie)

References

 Resource Publications, "The Christian Music Directories" formerly "The Recording Locator" - Christian Music Directories
 Manna Music Inc. - Manna Music Inc.
 Manna Records - Manna Records
 The Classic Imperials - Rick Evans with The Classic Imperials
 Welcome livinginfaith.com - BlueHost.com - Rick Evans - President of Living in Faith
Crownsmen album cover credits

American gospel musical groups
Southern gospel performers
Musical groups established in 1970